Physical Funk is the second studio album by American rapper Domino. It was released on June 11, 1996 through Outburst Records. Production was handled by Domino himself, with Anthony "Anti" Lewis and Greedy Greg serving as executive producers.

The album peaked at No. 152 on the Billboard 200 and No. 34 on the Top R&B/Hip-Hop Albums chart. Two singles made it to the charts, "Physical Funk", which peaked at No. 87 on the Billboard Hot 100 and No. 11 on the Hot Rap Songs chart, while "So Fly" made it to No. 17 on the Hot Rap Songs. The album has been out of print since 1998 and is considered a collectors items for a lot of rap g-funk collectors.

Track listing

Personnel
Shawn "Domino" Ivy – vocals, keyboards, piano, drums, producer
Trevor Lawrence, Jr. - drums
Darroll Crooks – guitar, bass
Earl Flemming – piano
Kevin "Battlecat" Gilliam – co-producer (track 8)
Warren Cee – organ arrangement
Rod Michaels – recording
Sean Freehill – mixing
Chris Puram – re-mixing
Ron McMaster – mastering
Wallace "Wally T." Traugott – mastering
Anthony "Anti" Lewis – executive producer
Greedy Greg – executive producer

Charts

References

External links

1996 albums
G-funk albums
Domino (rapper) albums
Def Jam Recordings albums